The Australian Literature Society Gold Medal (ALS Gold Medal) is awarded annually by the Association for the Study of Australian Literature for "an outstanding literary work in the preceding calendar year." From 1928 to 1974 it was awarded by the Australian Literature Society, then from 1983 by the Association for the Study of Australian Literature, when the two organisations were merged.

Award winners

2020s
 2022: Andy Jackson, Human Looking
 2021: Nardi Simpson – Song of the Crocodile
2020: Charmaine Papertalk Green — Nganajungu Yagu

2010s
 2019: Pam Brown — click here for what we do
 2018: Shastra Deo – The Agonist
 2017: Zoe Morrison – Music and Freedom
 2016: Brenda Niall – Mannix
 2015: Jennifer Maiden – Drones and Phantoms
 2014: Alexis Wright – The Swan Book
 2013: Michelle de Kretser – Questions of Travel
 2012: Gillian Mears – Foal's Bread
 2011: Kim Scott – That Deadman Dance
 2010: David Malouf – Ransom

2000s
 2009: Christos Tsiolkas – The Slap
 2008: Michelle de Kretser – The Lost Dog
 2007: Alexis Wright – Carpentaria
 2006: Gregory Day – The Patron Saint of Eels
 2005: Gail Jones – Sixty Lights
 2004: Laurie Duggan – Mangroves
 2003: Kate Jennings – Moral Hazard
 2002: Richard Flanagan – Gould's Book of Fish
 2001: Rodney Hall – The Day We Had Hitler Home
 2000: Drusilla Modjeska – Stravinsky's Lunch

1990s
 1999: Murray Bail – Eucalyptus
 1998: James Cowan – A Mapmaker's Dream
 1997: Robert Dessaix – Night Letters
 1996: Amanda Lohrey – Camille's Bread
 1995: Helen Demidenko – The Hand That Signed the Paper
 1994: Louis Nowra – Radiance and The Temple
 1993: Elizabeth Riddell – Selected Poems
 1992: Rodney Hall – The Second Bridegroom
 1991: Elizabeth Jolley – Cabin Fever
 1990: Peter Porter – Possible Worlds

1980s
 1989: Frank Moorhouse – Forty-seventeen
 1988: Brian Matthews – Louisa
 1987: Alan Wearne – The Nightmarkets
 1986: Thea Astley – Beachmasters
 1985: David Ireland – Archimedes and the Seagle
 1984: Les Murray – The People's Other World
 1983: David Malouf – Child's Play; Fly Away Peter
 1980–82: No Award

1970s
 1975–79: No Award
 1974: David Malouf – Neighbours in a Thicket
 1973: Francis Webb
 1972: Alex Buzo – Macquarie (play)
 1971: Colin Badger
 1970: Manning Clark

1960s
 1966: A. D. Hope
 1965: Patrick White – The Burnt Ones
 1964: Geoffrey Blainey – The Rush that Never Ended
 1963: John Morrison – Twenty-Three : Stories
 1962: Vincent Buckley – Masters in Israel
 1960: William Hart-Smith – Poems of Discovery

1950s
 1959: Randolph Stow – To the Islands
 1957: Martin Boyd – A Difficult Young Man
 1955: Patrick White – The Tree of Man
 1954: Mary Gilmore – Fourteen Men
 1952: Tom Hungerford – The Ridge and the River : A Novel
 1951: Rex Ingamells – The Great South Land : An Epic Poem
 1950: Jon Cleary – Just Let Me Be

1940s
 1949: Percival Serle – Dictionary of Australian Biography
 1948: Herz Bergner – Between Sky and Sea
 1942: Kylie Tennant – The Battlers
 1941: Patrick White – Happy Valley
 1940: William Baylebridge – This Vital Flesh

1930s
 1939: Xavier Herbert – Capricornia
 1938: R. D. FitzGerald – Moonlight Acre
 1937: Seaforth Mackenzie – The Young Desire It
 1936: Eleanor Dark – Return to Coolami
 1935: Winifred Birkett – Earth's Quality
 1934: Eleanor Dark – Prelude to Christopher
 1933: G. B. Lancaster (Edith J. Lyttleton) – Pageant
 1932: Leonard Mann – Flesh in Armour
 1931: Frank Dalby Davison – Man-Shy
 1930: Vance Palmer – The Passage

1920s
 1929: Henry Handel Richardson – Ultima Thule
 1928: Martin Mills (Martin Boyd) – The Montforts

Shortlisted works 

2022

 Emily Bitto, Wild Abandon
 Andy Jackson, Human Looking
 John Kinsella, Pushing Back
 S. J. Norman, Permafrost
 Elfie Shiosaki, Homecoming
 Maria Takolander, Trigger Warning

2021

 Robbie Arnott, The Rain Heron
 Luke Best, Cadaver Dog
 Laura Jean McKay, The Animals in That Country
 Ronnie Scott, The Adversary
 Nardi Simpson, Song of the Crocodile
 Ellen van Neerven, Throat

2020
 Jordie Albiston, Element
 Charmaine Papertalk Green, Nganajungu Yagu
 Favel Parrett, There Was Still Love 
 Carrie Tiffany, Exploded View
 Charlotte Wood, The Weekend

2019

 Luke Beesley, Aqua Spinach
 Laura Elizabeth Woollett, Beautiful Revolutionary
 Pam Brown, click here for what we do
 Charmaine Papertalk Green & John Kinsella, False Claims of Colonial Thieves
 Jamie Marina Lau, Pink Mountain on Locust Island
 Gail Jones, The Death of Noah Glass

2018

 Peter Carey, A Long Way from Home
 Shastra Deo, The Agonist
 Eva Hornung, The Last Garden
 Sofie Laguna, The Choke
 Steven Lang, Hinterland
 Gerald Murnane, Border Districts

2017

 Steven Amsterdam, The Easy Way Out
 Georgia Blain, Between a Wolf and a Dog
 Peter Boyle, Ghostspeaking
 Zoe Morrison, Music and Freedom
 Heather Rose, The Museum of Modern Love
 Rajith Savanadasa, Ruins

2016

 James Bradley, Clade
 Tegan Bennett Daylight, Six Bedrooms
 Drusilla Modjeska, Second Half First
 Brenda Niall, Mannix

2015

 Joan London, The Golden Age
 Jennifer Maiden, Drones and Phantoms
 David Malouf, Earth Hour
 Favel Parrett, When the Night Comes
 Inga Simpson, Nest

2014
 Eleanor Limprecht, What Was Left
 Luke Carman, An Elegant Young Man
 Hannah Kent, Burial Rites
 Christos Tsiolkas, Barracuda
 Alex Miller, Coal Creek
 Alexis Wright, The Swan Book

2013
 Jessie Cole, Darkness on the Edge of Town
 Michelle de Kretser, Questions of Travel
 Robert Drewe, Montebello
 Christopher Koch, Lost Voices
 P. A. O’Reilly, The Fine Colour of Rust

2012
 Steven Amsterdam, What the Family Needed
 Christopher Edwards, People of Earth
 Diane Fahey, The Wing Collection: New & Selected poems
 Gillian Mears, Foal's Bread
 Favel Parrett, Past The Shallows
 Anna Funder, All That I Am
 Gail Jones, Five Bells
 Alex Miller, Autumn Laing
 Elliot Perlman, The Street Sweeper
 Gig Ryan, Gig Ryan: New and Selected Poems
 Jaya Savige, Surface to Air

2011
 Peter Boyle, Apocrypha 
 Peter Goldsworthy, Gravel
 Kim Scott, That Deadman Dance
 Kirsten Tranter, The Legacy
 Chris Womersley, Bereft

2010
 Emily Ballou, The Darwin Poems
 Steven Carroll, The Lost Life
 Eva Hornung, Dog Boy
 Cate Kennedy, The World Beneath
 David Malouf, Ransom

2008
 Michelle de Kretser, The Lost Dog
 J. S. Harry, Not Finding Wittgenstein
 Rhyll McMaster, Feather Man
 David Malouf, Typewriter Music
 Alex Miller, Landscape of Farewell

See also 

 Australian literature

References

External links 
 Association for the Study of Australian Literature (ASAL)
 

Australian fiction awards
Awards established in 1928
1928 establishments in Australia